Nebria genei is a species of ground beetle in the Nebriinae subfamily that is endemic to the island of Sardinia.

References

External links
Nebria genei at Carabidae of the World

genei
Beetles described in 1839
Beetles of Europe
Endemic arthropods of Sardinia